Cleveland Leigh "Cleve" Abbott (some sources say "Cleveland S. Abbott") (December 9, 1894 – April 14, 1955) was an American football player, coach and educator. He was the head coach of the Tuskegee University Golden Tigers football team from 1923 to 1954.

Life

Abbott was born in Yankton, South Dakota in 1894, one of seven children to Albert B. (aka Elbert) Abbott (1862 Abbeville, GA – 1952 Huron, SD) and Mollie Brown Abbott (1868–1909).

Abbott graduated from high school (1908–1912) Watertown, South Dakota. He received his bachelor's degree (1912–1916) from South Dakota State College (SDSC) in Brookings, South Dakota. He was an outstanding, multi-sport athlete at Watertown High School (16 varsity sports letters) and SDSC (now SDSU) (14 varsity letters). Hired by Booker T. Washington in 1913 to be the Tuskegee Institute football coach and dairy instructor upon 1916 SDSC graduation.

He joined the US Army in 1917 at Camp Dodge and served in Europe in World War I as an officer in the 366th Infantry Regiment

After mustered out in 1919, Abbott taught at the Kansas Vocational School in Topeka, Kansas. In 1923, Abbott accepted a position as Athletic Director, professor and coach at Tuskegee. Abbott was the eighth head football coach for the Tuskegee University Golden Tigers located in Tuskegee, Alabama and he held that position for 32 seasons, from 1923 until 1954. Abbott earned the respect of his peers through his team's performance and by participating in national committees for the selection of "all-American" players at the collegiate level.

He was the first African-American member of USA Track and Field Board circa 1940 and the first African-American member of the US Olympic Committee in 1946. He coached the first African-American Olympic champion, Alice Coachman (1948 high jump), and the second, Mildred McDaniel (1956 high jump).

He was married to Jessie Harriette Scott (March 23, 1897, Des Moines, Iowa – August 12, 1982, Tuskegee, Alabama) and had had a daughter, Jessie Ellen Abbott.

Abbott died on April 17, 1955, in Tuskegee, Alabama.

Cleveland Abbott was inducted into the South Dakota Hall of Fame in September 2018.

Head coaching record

College

See also
 List of college football coaches with 200 wins

References

External links
 USATF Hall of Fame
 SDSU Athletic Hall of Fame
 Abbott, Cleveland Leigh (1892–1955) at BlackPast.org
 

1894 births
1955 deaths
American men's basketball players
South Dakota State Jackrabbits baseball players
South Dakota State Jackrabbits football players
South Dakota State Jackrabbits men's basketball players
Tuskegee Golden Tigers athletic directors
Tuskegee Golden Tigers football coaches
Tuskegee Golden Tigers men's basketball coaches
South Dakota State Jackrabbits men's track and field athletes
Tuskegee Golden Tigers track and field coaches
Tuskegee University faculty
United States Army personnel of World War I
United States Army officers
People from Yankton, South Dakota
People from Watertown, South Dakota
Coaches of American football from South Dakota
Players of American football from South Dakota
Baseball coaches from South Dakota
Basketball coaches from South Dakota
Basketball players from South Dakota
African-American coaches of American football
African-American players of American football
African-American basketball coaches
20th-century African-American sportspeople
African Americans in World War I
African-American United States Army personnel
Military personnel from South Dakota